Holford is a village in Somerset, England.

Holford may also refer to:

 Holford (surname)
 Holford, a community within Chatsworth, Ontario
 Holford Bonds, real estate bonds in Arkansas, USA
 Holford, a district of Perry Barr, Birmingham, England
 River Holford in Somerset, England
 Blessed Thomas Holford Catholic College in Cheshire, England

See also
 Halford (disambiguation)